Independent or Independents may refer to:

Arts, entertainment, and media

Artist groups
 Independents (artist group), a group of modernist painters based in the New Hope, Pennsylvania, area of the United States during the early 1930s
 Independents (Oporto artist group), a Portuguese artist group historically linked to abstract art and to Fernando Lanhas, the central figure of Portuguese abstractionism

Music

Groups, labels, and genres
 Independent music, a number of genres associated with independent labels
 Independent record label, a record label not associated with a major label
 Independent Albums, American albums chart

Albums
 Independent (Ai album), 2012
 Independent (Faze album), 2006
 Independent (Sacred Reich album), 1993

Songs
 "Independent" (song), a 2007 song by Webbie
 "Independent", a 2002 song by Ayumi Hamasaki from H

News and media organizations
 The Independent, a British online newspaper.
 The Malta Independent, a Maltese newspaper and online newspaper
 Independent Online (South Africa), a news and information website based in South Africa, owned by Sekunjalo Investments since 2013
Independent News & Media, the largest publisher of print material in South Africa and owner of Independent Online until 2013
Independent Media Center (also known as Indymedia or IMC), an open publishing network of journalist collectives that report on political and social issues, e.g., in The Indypendent newspaper of NYC
 ITV (TV network) (Independent Television), a British television channel

Periodicals
Grand Island Independent, a newspaper published in Grand Island, Nebraska
Indy Week,  formerly known as the Independent Weekly and originally the North Carolina Independent
 Irish Independent, newspaper
 Long Beach Independent, a morning edition newspaper published in Long Beach, California
 Marshall Independent, a daily newspaper published in Marshall, Minnesota
 San Francisco Independent, formerly the largest non-daily U.S. newspaper
 Santa Barbara Independent,  a news, arts, and alternative newspaper published every Thursday in Santa Barbara, California, United States

Other uses in arts, entertainment, and media
 Independents (film), a 2008 American documentary
 Independent bookstore, bookstore that is not part of a chain
 Independent film, film produced by a small movie studio
 Independent publisher, small press not associated with a major publisher
 Independent radio, radio stations independent of government or conglomerate interference
 Independent sources, in journalism, two or more sources which attest to a given piece of information
 Independent station, television or radio station that is not affiliated with any network

Mathematics and statistics
 Dependent and independent variables, the argument of a mathematical function
 Independent, in Independence (probability theory), a variable whose occurrence does not affect the probability of occurrence of another
 Independence (mathematical logic), unprovability of a sentence (e.g. the Parallel postulate) from other sentences (e.g. the remaining Euclidean geometry axioms)

Military
 Independent Company, a World War II British unit
 Independent Highland Companies, units of Scottish Highlanders in the 17th and 18th centuries
 Independent Illinois Volunteer Cavalry Companies of the American Civil War
 Norwegian Independent Company 1, a World War II Norwegian unit
 British Army Independent Companies of Foot, British units in the French and Indian Wars

Politics
Independent city, city that does not form part of another local government entity
Independent politician, not affiliated with any political party
Independent voter, not a member of any political party
Independent voting movement (U.S.), not affiliated with any political party
Independents (political party), a political party in the Czech Republic

Religion
 Independent (religion), name for supporters of a disestablished Protestant church during the English Civil War, closely identified with support for the English Commonwealth, of which Oliver Cromwell is best known
 Independent church, or non-denominational church, a church unaffiliated with a denominational organization
 Union of Welsh Independents, Congregationlist denomination in Wales

Sports
 Independent circuit, professional wrestling shows not associated with the major wrestling promotions
In U.S. college sports, schools that are not members of an NCAA or NAIA athletic conference, including:
 NCAA Division I FBS independent schools, for football
 NCAA Division I FCS independent schools, for football
 NCAA Division I independent schools (baseball)
 NCAA Division I independent schools (basketball)
 NCAA Division I independent schools (ice hockey)
 NCAA Division I independent schools (soccer)
 NCAA Division II independent schools, for all sports
 NCAA Division III independent schools, for all sports
 NCAA independent schools (lacrosse), for all divisions
 NAIA independent schools, for all sports

Other uses
Independent Institute, an American libertarian think tank
Dependent and independent verb forms in Goidelic languages
Independent business, privately owned companies
Independent clothes store, boutique not associated with the larger retailers
Independent contractor, organisation or individual which provides goods or services under terms specified in a contract
Independent school, school which is not dependent upon national or local government for financing its operation
Independent Truck Company, an American skateboarding brand
Vickers A1E1 Independent, British multi-turreted tank designed during the Interwar period

See also
 Independence (disambiguation)
 Independent Township (disambiguation)
 Independente (disambiguation)
 Indie (disambiguation)
 Independent music, artistic creations outside the commercial mainstream
 Alternative comics
 Indie game, video games that are created independently of the financial backing of a large publishing company
 Systems theory
 L'Indépendant (disambiguation)
 The Independent (disambiguation)
 The Independents (disambiguation)
The Indypendent, a newspaper of the New York City Independent Media Center
 Third-party source